Andre Agassi was the defending champion but lost in the first round to Thomas Enqvist.

Lleyton Hewitt won in the final 6–4, 6–4 against Mark Philippoussis.

Seeds

  Lleyton Hewitt (champion)
  Andre Agassi (first round)
  David Nalbandian (quarterfinals)
  Paradorn Srichaphan (first round)
  Rainer Schüttler (second round)
  Àlex Corretja (quarterfinals)
  Juan Ignacio Chela (first round)
  Xavier Malisse (first round)

Draw

Finals

Top half

Bottom half

External links
 Main draw

2003
2003 ATP Tour
2003 Tennis Channel Open